Daya Singh (born Daya Ram; 1661–1708) was one of the Panj Pyare, the first five Sikhs to be initiated into the Khalsa order in 17th-century India.

References 

 Santokh Singh, Bhai, Sn Gur Pratap Sura/` Granth. Amritsar, 1926–37
 Kuir Singh, Gurbilas Patshahi 10. Patiala, 1968
 Chhibbar, Kesar Singh, Bansava/inama Dasari Patshahian Ka. Chandigarh, 1972
 Macauliffe, Max Arthur,  The Sikh Religion. Oxford, 1909
 Khushwant Singh, A History of the Sikhs, vol. I. Princeton, 1963
 Harbans Singh, Guru Gobind Singh. Chandigarh, 1966

Indian Sikhs
Singh, Bhai Daya
History of Punjab
People from Sialkot
1661 births
1708 deaths